Mather Zickel (born ) is an American actor, mainly known for comedy roles, as well as the character Kieran in Rachel Getting Married. A native of New York City, he has worked in both film and television since the late 1990s. He graduated from the Pomfret School in 1988 and New York University in 1992. He co-starred as "Rob the Federal Agent" in season two of Delocated and as Will Keen in the ABC sitcom Man Up!. He was also a recurring character in season 2 of Showtime's House of Lies and appeared in Masters of Sex. Other credits include the films like The Ten, and Wanderlust. He is a frequent collaborator of members of The State.

Filmography

Film

Television

References

External links
Mather Zickel On Facebook

Mather Zickel Interview

Living people
1970s births
Male actors from New York (state)
American male film actors
American male television actors
Tisch School of the Arts alumni
20th-century American male actors
21st-century American male actors
Pomfret School alumni